Olena Zubrilova (Alena Zubrylava, ; born 25 February 1973 in Shostka, Ukrainian SSR) is a Ukrainian biathlete who has been competing for Belarus since 2002. Prior to that, she had competed for Ukraine from 1991 until she changed her citizenship to Belarus in 2002.

Career
Zubrilova has won a total of seventeen Biathlon World Championships medals in her career, including four gold (pursuit, individual, and mass start: all 1999; and mass start: 2002), five silvers (individual: 1997, 2003; sprint: 1997; pursuit: 1997 and team event: 1996), and eight bronzes (relay: 1996, 2000, 2001, and 2005; sprint: 1999 and 2005; individual: 2001; and team event: 1997). She also competed in three Winter Olympics, her best individual finish was 5th in the 7.5 km at Turin in 2006.

Zubrilova as of 2006 also has the most victories at the Holmenkollen ski festival's biathlon event with five (1999: individual, sprint, pursuit, and mass start; 2002: pursuit). She also has 21 victories in her career.

A divorced mother of one, Zubrilova makes her living as a coach.

External links
IBU Profile

1973 births
Living people
People from Shostka
Biathletes at the 1994 Winter Olympics
Biathletes at the 1998 Winter Olympics
Biathletes at the 2002 Winter Olympics
Biathletes at the 2006 Winter Olympics
Holmenkollen Ski Festival winners
Ukrainian female biathletes
Belarusian female biathletes
Olympic biathletes of Belarus
Olympic biathletes of Ukraine
Biathlon World Championships medalists
Ukrainian emigrants to Belarus
Naturalized citizens of Belarus
Sportspeople from Sumy Oblast